ARC Music is a world music and folk music label based in West Sussex, England, that was established in 1976. Naxos acquired ARC in 2019.

Film and television
ARC Music has been used in the films Indiana Jones and the Kingdom of the Crystal Skull, Casino Royale, Burn After Reading, The Kingdom, The Constant Gardener. and Skyfall.

Notable artists
Ana Alcaide
Mark Atkins
Clannad
David Fanshawe
Golden Bough
Seckou Keita
Pete Lockett
Charlie McMahon
Suzanna Owiyo
Ramin Rahimi
Hossam Ramzy
Saor Patrol
Baluji Shrivastav
Yale Strom
Cheng Yu
Otava Yo

References

World music record labels
English record labels
Record labels established in 1983